Danila Sergeyevich Yashchuk (born 13 March 1995) is a Russian professional football player. He plays for Yadro St. Petersburg.

Club career
He made his debut in the Russian Premier League on 26 May 2013 for FC Zenit Saint Petersburg in a game against FC Amkar Perm.

References

External links
 
 Profile by the Russian Premier League 
 

1995 births
Sportspeople from Kaliningrad
Living people
Russian footballers
Russian expatriate footballers
Russia youth international footballers
Russia under-21 international footballers
Association football midfielders
Russian Premier League players
Armenian Premier League players
Ykkönen players
FC Zenit Saint Petersburg players
FC Zenit-2 Saint Petersburg players
FC Kuban Krasnodar players
FC Volgar Astrakhan players
FC Ararat-Armenia players
AC Kajaani players
FC Dynamo Saint Petersburg players
Russian expatriate sportspeople in Armenia
Russian expatriate sportspeople in Finland
Expatriate footballers in Armenia
Expatriate footballers in Finland